, often called , is a Japanese women's professional wrestling promotion. It is based in the city of Sendai, Miyagi in the Tohoku region.

History

Sendai Girls' Pro Wrestling was founded in 2005 by Meiko Satomura, a female professional wrestler who achieved success in the 2000s with the women's promotion Gaea Japan, and Jinsei Shinzaki, a male professional wrestler who is also the president of Michinoku Pro Wrestling.

As the only experienced wrestler on the initial roster, Satomura served as the trainer and booker in addition to her duties as a wrestler.  On July 9, 2006 the new promotion held its first show in front of 2498 fans at Sendai's Sun Plaza. This show consisted of Senjo's first four wrestlers making their debuts in singles matches against four legends of joshi puroresu. The main event featured Satomura against Aja Kong, whom she has feuded with throughout her career. Due to the small size of the roster, most of Senjo's subsequent shows have featured the Sendai girls facing wrestlers from other promotions.

It was confirmed that Sendai will held an event on July 27, 2019 in Manchester, England, along with the British promotion Fight Club: Pro. This was Sendai's first event outside of Japan.

On the last night of World Wonder Ring Stardom's Stardom Cinderella Tournament 2021, Rin Kadokura made an appearance by teaming up with members of the STARS stable Mayu Iwatani, Starlight Kid, Hanan and Koguma to face Oedo Tai's Natsuko Tora, Konami, Fukigen Death, Ruaka and Saki Kashima.

Roster

Notable alumni/guests 

 Alex Lee
 Andras Miyagi
 Aja Kong
 Ami Miura
 Gami
 Hikaru Shida
 Hibiki
 Hiren
 Hiroyo Matsumoto 
 Kagetsu
 Kaneko Natsuho 
 Kaoru Ito
 Kazuki
 Mari Harada
 Maria
 Mei Hoshizuki 
 Miyako Morino
 Mio Momono 
 Natsumi Maki
 Rin Kadokura 
 Rydeen Hagane
 Ryo Mizunami
 Sakura Hirota
 Sareee
 Sawako Shimono
 Sendai Sachiko
 Tyrannosaurus Okuda
 Syuri
 Yako Fujigasaki
 Yuu 
 Yuu Yamagata

Championships 

References

External links

 Sendai Girls' Pro Wrestling official site, in Japanese
 Purolove site, in German

Japanese women's professional wrestling promotions
2005 establishments in Japan
Sport in Sendai